Tunisia has participated six times in the FIFA World Cup, the biggest men's football event in the world, in 1978, 1998, 2002, 2006, 2018 and 2022. Tunisia has never been able to advance past the group stage on any of these occasions; they have played eighteen games, winning three, with five draws and ten defeats. The selection played its first qualifying match for a World Cup on 30 October 1960 against Morocco at the Stade d'Honneur, Casablanca.

Wahbi Khazri is the Tunisian player who has scored the most goals in the competition with three: two in 2018 and one in the 2022 edition. Riadh Bouazizi and Kaies Ghodhbane are the two Tunisian players with the most matches played (eight games each in 1998, 2002 and 2006).

Summary

By match

FIFA World Cup record
As of 2022, Tunisia have never advanced past the group stage of a World Cup. They have won three matches: against Mexico in 1978, Panama in 2018, and France in 2022.

1978 FIFA World Cup

Tunisia's first World Cup was the 1978 competition held in Argentina. They became the first African team to win a World Cup game, defeating Mexico 3–1 in Rosario. A 1–0 defeat to 1974 bronze-medalists Poland followed. Although The Eagles Of Carthage then held reigning champions West Germany to a 0–0 draw, they failed to advance. Tunisia failed to qualify for the FIFA World Cup again until twenty years later.

Tunisia v Mexico

Poland v Tunisia

West Germany v Tunisia

1998 FIFA World Cup
Adel Sellimi's team were beaten 2–0 by England, and 1–0 by Colombia to eliminate them at the group stage. Their only point was in a 1–1 draw with Romania.

England vs Tunisia

Colombia vs Tunisia

Romania vs Tunisia

2002 FIFA World Cup
Tunisia reached their second successive FIFA World Cup (and third overall), which was co-hosted by South Korea and Japan. They started with a 2–0 loss against Russia, but a Raouf Bouzaiene free-kick gave them a 1–1 draw against Belgium in their second match. Their final group game resulted in a 2–0 defeat to co-hosts Japan, meaning they were knocked out in the group stages yet again.

All times local (UTC+9)

Russia v Tunisia

Tunisia v Belgium

Tunisia v Japan

2006 FIFA World Cup 

Tunisia drew their opening game against Saudi Arabia 2–2, but lost their second match to Spain 3–1 and lost their last group match to Ukraine 1–0, ending their 2006 FIFA World Cup campaign.

All times local (CEST/UTC+2)

Tunisia vs Saudi Arabia

Spain vs Tunisia

Ukraine vs Tunisia

2018 FIFA World Cup

Tunisia vs England

The two teams had met in two matches, including one game at the 1998 FIFA World Cup group stage, an England 2–0 victory.

England scored in the 11th minute when Mouez Hassen stopped a John Stones' header from a corner from the left, but could not save a Harry Kane follow-up from close range. Hassen was substituted four minutes later for Farouk Ben Mustapha due to an injury earlier in the game, after he had a collision with Jesse Lingard. Lingard then mishit a volley from Ashley Young's cross to the far post. After 10 minutes, Ferjani Sassi equalised from the penalty spot after Kyle Walker was penalised for an elbow on Fakhreddine Ben Youssef. Kane had an appeal for a penalty waved away within five minutes of the restart as he was seemingly impeded by a pair of Tunisia players at a corner. In the additional time, Harry Maguire flicked a Kieran Trippier corner from the right into the path of Kane, who headed it inside the goal after being left free at the back post.

England scored more than once for the first time in 10 World Cup matches, since a 2–2 draw against Sweden in 2006. Kane became the first England player to score a brace in a World Cup match since Gary Lineker against Cameroon in 1990.

Belgium vs Tunisia

The two teams had faced each other in three matches, including one game at the 2002 FIFA World Cup group stage, which ended in a 1–1 draw.

Just 6 minutes into the game, Syam Ben Youssef's late challenge on Eden Hazard was deemed, with the use of VAR, to have been just inside the area and he stepped up to score the penalty into the bottom-left corner. Ten minutes later, Dries Mertens won possession just inside the Tunisia half before driving forward and passing the ball to Romelu Lukaku. Lukaku then shot a low strike across Farouk Ben Mustapha into the bottom-right corner. Wahbi Khazri's free-kick from the left was met by Dylan Bronn, who flashed a header past Thibaut Courtois. Thomas Meunier found Lukaku inside the area, which he clipped over the onrushing Mustapha. Toby Alderweireld's long pass from defence was taken on the chest by Hazard, who then rounded Mustapha to stroke into an empty net. Michy Batshuayi met Youri Tielemans' cross at the back post with a controlled half-volley to score Belgium's 5th. Khazri scored deep into stoppage time after a swivel in the box.

Lukaku became the first player since Diego Maradona to score back-to-back braces in consecutive world cup games. Hazard's penalty was Belgium's second quickest goal in a World Cup match (5:59), behind only Léopold Anoul's goal against England in 1954, in the fifth minute. For Tunisia, it has registered as their worst defeat ever in their World Cup history.

Panama vs Tunisia

The two teams had never met before. Both teams had already been eliminated from the tournament before the match.

Panama took the lead in the 33rd minute, after a José Rodríguez shot from outside the penalty area took a deflection off Yassine Meriah and nestle in the back of the net. In the 51st minute, Naïm Sliti found Wahbi Khazri down the right and the latter's low cross was converted by the Fakhreddine Ben Youssef just six yards out. At the 66 minute mark, Khazri finished off a cross from the left by Oussama Haddadi from close range at the back post.

Tunisia won a World Cup match after 40 years, since their 3–1 victory over Mexico in 1978. Panama became the first nation since Serbia & Montenegro and Togo in 2006 to lose each of their first three World Cup games. Panama's goal means this is the first World Cup tournament in which every side has scored at least two goals in the competition. Meriah's own goal was the 50th in World Cup history.

2022 FIFA World Cup

Denmark vs Tunisia
The two teams had faced each other twice, most recently in 2002, a 2–1 win for Denmark in a friendly game.
Denmark were not able to capitalize in their opening game; although Tunisia failed to score a single goal themselves, they still managed to secure their match without problems, with Aïssa Laïdouni earning the Man of the Match.

Tunisia vs Australia
The two teams have faced each other twice, most recently in Tunisia's 2–0 win at the 2005 FIFA Confederations Cup.

Australia beat Tunisia 1–0 to secure their first win in a World Cup match since 2010 when they defeated Serbia 2–1. Mitchell Duke became the first player in the history to score in the FIFA World Cup while playing for a second-tier division club, as he represented Fagiano Okayama in the J2 League when the World Cup started.

Tunisia vs France
The two teams had faced each other four times, most recently in a 2010 friendly, a 1–1 draw.

Despite being eliminated due to Australia's win against Denmark, Tunisia's victory against France marked the first time the nation had ever beaten the current title holders at the World Cup.

Record players

Top goalscorers

References

External links
Tunisia at FIFA
World Cup Finals Statistics

 
Countries at the FIFA World Cup